The Italian Union of Hospital Workers (UIL SANITA) was a trade union representing workers in the healthcare sector in Italy.

The union was founded in 1950 as the Italian Union of Autonomous Hospital Unions, and was a founding affiliate of the Italian Labour Union (UIL).  It held its first conference in 1953.

By 1997, the union had 99,596 members.  In 2000, it merged with the National Union of Local Authority Employees, to form the Italian Union of Local Authority Workers.

References

Healthcare trade unions
Trade unions established in 1950
Trade unions disestablished in 2000
Trade unions in Italy